Penstemon centranthifolius is a species of penstemon known by the common name scarlet bugler. It is native to California and parts of Mexico, where it grows in many types of dry habitat from coast to desert, such as chaparral and oak woodland.

Description
Penstemon centranthifolius is a perennial herb with many straight, hairless, erect branches which may exceed one meter in maximum height. The thick, untoothed leaves may be up to 10 centimeters long and are arranged oppositely, with some pairs fused together about the stem. The top of the stem is occupied by a long inflorescence bearing narrow tubular flowers with small projecting lobes at the lips, the longest flowers 3 centimeters long. The flowers are bright red to orange-red and hairless all over, including the staminode.

Hybrids
This species commonly hybridizes with showy penstemon (Penstemon spectabilis), a species with wide-mouthed purple-blue flowers, to produce a penstemon with pinkish-purple flowers which is intermediate in size and named Penstemon × parishii.

See also
 California chaparral and woodlands

References

External links
 
 

centranthifolius
Flora of California
Flora of Baja California
Flora of Northwestern Mexico
Flora of the California desert regions
Flora of the Sierra Nevada (United States)
Natural history of the California chaparral and woodlands
Natural history of the California Coast Ranges
Natural history of the Central Valley (California)
Natural history of the Channel Islands of California
Natural history of the Mojave Desert
Natural history of the Peninsular Ranges
Natural history of the San Francisco Bay Area
Natural history of the Santa Monica Mountains
Natural history of the Transverse Ranges
Flora without expected TNC conservation status